The 2020 V.League 2 (referred to as  LS V.League 2 for sponsorship reasons) is the 26th season of V.League 2, Vietnam's second tier professional football league. The season began on 5 June 2020 and finished on 31 October 2020.

For this season, there is only 1 promotion and 1 relegation spots due to the effects of the COVID-19 pandemic, and the league will be expand to 14 clubs since the 2021 season.

Changes from last season

Team changes
The following teams had changed division since the 2018 season.

To V.League 2
Promoted from 2019 Vietnamese National Football Second League
 Bà Rịa–Vũng Tàu
Relegated from 2019 V.League 1
 Sanna Khánh Hòa

From V.League 2
Relegated to 2020 Vietnamese National Football Second League
 Phù Đổng
Promoted to 2020 V.League 1
 Hồng Lĩnh Hà Tĩnh

Teams

Stadia and locations

Personnel and kits

Managerial changes

Phase 1 League table

Phase 2 League table

Promotion group

Relegation group

Results

Positions by round

Promotion group

Relegation group

Season progress

Schedule 
Details (in Vietnamese): https://vpf.vn/tai-lieu-vleague/vleague-thong-bao/lich-thi-dau-giai-vdqg-ls-2020/

Season statistics

Top scorers

See also
 2020 V.League 1
 2020 Vietnamese National Football Second League
 2020 Vietnamese National Football Third League

References

External links
Official Page

V.League 2
2020 in Vietnamese football
Vietnam